Henry John Bede Milford was a politician in Queensland, Australia. He was a Member of both the New South Wales Legislative Assembly and the Queensland Legislative Assembly.

Early life and career 
Born in England in 1832 or 1833, Milford moved to Sydney, Australia with his family in 1843. He became an articled clerk before being admitted as a solicitor in 1855. He practised in Sydney until 1867. He was married to Catherine Charlotte Dick and had three sons and a daughter.

Politics 
He represented the electoral district of Braidwood in the New South Wales Legislative Assembly from 3 February 1864 to	10 November 1864.

He represented the electoral district of Rockhampton from 6 December 1869 to 7 June 1870. Winning the seat in a by-election, he resigned before ever taking his seat.

Later life 
Milford died on 29 February 1888 and, according to the Charters Towers Daily Herald (2 March 1888), he died of "excess drink and exposure".

References

 

Members of the Queensland Legislative Assembly
1888 deaths
People from Queensland
Members of the New South Wales Legislative Assembly
1830s births
19th-century Australian politicians